Yevgeny Nikolaevich Brago (born 1 March 1929) is a Russian rower who competed for the Soviet Union in the 1952 Summer Olympics. He was born in Moscow. In 1952 he won the silver medal as crew member of the Soviet boat in the eights event.

References

External links
 
 

1929 births
Possibly living people
Russian male rowers
Soviet male rowers
Olympic rowers of the Soviet Union
Rowers at the 1952 Summer Olympics
Olympic silver medalists for the Soviet Union
Olympic medalists in rowing
Medalists at the 1952 Summer Olympics
European Rowing Championships medalists